Aphilopota foedata is a species of moth of the family Geometridae first described by Max Bastelberger in 1907. It is found in Tanzania.

This species looks dirty yellowish grey, irregularly sprayed with fine black spots on the forewings and hindwings. The male has a wingspan of 40–41 mm.

References

Endemic fauna of Tanzania
Ennominae
Moths described in 1907
Insects of Tanzania
Moths of Africa